Rasbora patrickyapi is a species of cyprinid fish. It is endemic to Kalimantan, Indonesian Borneo. It inhabits peat swamps and blackwater streams. It grows to  standard length.

References 

Rasboras
Freshwater fish of Borneo
Freshwater fish of Indonesia
Endemic fauna of Borneo
Endemic fauna of Indonesia
Fish described in 2009
Taxa named by Heok Hui Tan